Apostag is a  village and municipality in Bács-Kiskun county, in the Southern Great Plain region of southern Hungary.

Croats in Hungary call this village Štagara.

Geography

History
In the medieval ages the village had a rotunda with 12 sided poligonal shape and its patrocinium was: The 12 Apostles. There was also similar patrocinium of Bény rotunda, recently in Bíňa, Slovakia.

Gallery

References

 Gervers-Molnár Vera: A középkori Magyarország rotundái. (Romanesque Round Churches of Medieval Hungary.) (Mûvészettörténeti Füzetek, 4.) Akadémiai Kiadó. Budapest, 1972.

Notes

External links 
 Apostag Község hivatalos honlapja
 Apostag a Vendégvárón
 Apostag.lap.hu
 Légifotók Apostagról

Geography of Bács-Kiskun County
Populated places in Bács-Kiskun County